The Zorrillo Formation is a geologic formation in Mexico, near Tezoatlán de Segura y Luna, Oaxaca. It preserves fossils dating back to the Jurassic period.

See also

 List of fossiliferous stratigraphic units in Mexico

References
 

Jurassic Mexico